Reginald Edwin Hurst (6 June 1917 – 31 March 1973) was an Australian politician who represented the South Australian House of Assembly seat of Semaphore for the Labor Party from 1964 to 1973. He was Speaker of the South Australian House of Assembly for the Don Dunstan Labor government from 1970 to 1973.

References

 

1917 births
1973 deaths
Australian Labor Party members of the Parliament of South Australia
Members of the South Australian House of Assembly
Speakers of the South Australian House of Assembly